Clarence James "Bubber" Jonnard (November 23, 1897 – August 12, 1977) was a Major League Baseball catcher.  He played for the Chicago White Sox in 1920, the Pittsburgh Pirates in 1922, the Philadelphia Phillies in 1926, 1927 and 1935, and the St. Louis Cardinals in 1929.  He played 103 Major League games with 235 at bats, 54 hits, no home runs and 20 RBIs.  His lifetime batting average was .230, with a .267 on-base percentage and a .268 slugging percentage.   As a fielder, he caught 86 games with a fielding percentage of .960.  On December 13, 1927, he was part of a trade in which the Phillies received pitcher Jimmy Ring and catcher Johnny Schulte from the Cardinals in exchange for Jonnard, infielder Jimmy Cooney and outfielder Johnny Mokan.  

He served as a coach for the Phillies in 1935 and the New York Giants from 1942 to 1946.  He also served as a scout for the Giants, Kansas City Athletics, Baltimore Orioles and New York Mets.  Players he signed as Mets' scout included Ed Kranepool, Nino Espinosa, Mike Jorgensen, Ken Singleton and Leroy Stanton.

He played for several minor league teams, including the San Antonio Bronchos, Norfolk Mary Janes, Nashville Volunteers, Wichita Falls Spudders, Houston Buffaloes, Rochester Red Wings, Jersey City Skeeters, Dallas Steers and Fort Worth Cats.  In all, he played 987 minor league games with a batting average of .252 and 18 home runs.  He managed the minor league Dallas Steers as a player-manager in 1933 and he managed the Milford Giants in 1940. He also managed the Minneapolis Millerettes of the All-American Girls Professional Baseball League during the  season.

Jonnard was born on November 23, 1897, in Nashville, Tennessee.  His twin brother Claude Jonnard was a Major League pitcher for the New York Giants, St. Louis Browns and Chicago Cubs between 1921 and 1929.  Bubber and Claude were teammates on the Nashville Volunteers in 1920 and 1921, where the twin brothers formed the team's battery.  He died at the age of 79 on August 12, 1977, in New York City.  He is buried in Dallas, Texas.

References

External links

1897 births
1977 deaths
All-American Girls Professional Baseball League managers
Baltimore Orioles scouts
Baseball players from Nashville, Tennessee
Chicago White Sox players
Dallas Steers players
Fort Worth Cats players
Houston Buffaloes players
Jersey City Skeeters players
Kansas City Athletics scouts
Major League Baseball catchers
Major League Baseball scouts
Minor league baseball managers
Nashville Vols players
New York Giants (NL) coaches
New York Mets scouts
Norfolk Mary Janes players
Philadelphia Phillies coaches
Philadelphia Phillies players
Pittsburgh Pirates players
Rochester Red Wings players
St. Louis Cardinals players
San Antonio Bronchos players
Wichita Falls Spudders players